Andrej Razinger (born May 8, 1967) is a retired Slovenian professional ice hockey player.

Career

Club career
In 1983, Razinger made his debut in the Yugoslav Ice Hockey League with HK Kranjska Gora. In 1986, he joined HK Acroni Jesenice, and played with them until he retired in 2004. He played in 601 games, scoring 270 goals, and adding 244 assists.

International career
He represented both Yugoslavia and Slovenia in international competitions. Razinger participated in a total of 9 IIHF World Championships, scoring 129 goals and adding 73 assists in 155 games.

References

1967 births
Yugoslav ice hockey players
Slovenian ice hockey players
HK Acroni Jesenice players
Living people
Sportspeople from Jesenice, Jesenice